Sodium arsenate is the inorganic compound with the formula Na3AsO4.  Related salts are also called sodium arsenate, including  Na2HAsO4 (disodium hydrogen arsenate) and  NaH2AsO4 (sodium dihydrogen arsenate).  The trisodium salt is a white or colourless solid that is highly toxic.  It is usually handled as the dodecahydrate Na3AsO4.12H2O.

The compound can be obtained by neutralizing arsenic acid:
H3AsO4 + 3 NaOH   →    Na3AsO4 + 3 H2O
The salt (as its dodecahydrate) is isomorphous with trisodium phosphate.  The anion AsO43- exists at high pH, but below pH 11.5, it converts to HAsO42- (also written HOAsO32-).

References

Arsenates
Sodium compounds